Puerto Castilla  Airport  was an airport formerly serving Puerto Castilla, a municipality in Colón Department, Honduras.

Aerial imaging shows the western end of the paved runway built over by buildings and storage from the Puerto Castilla container port, leaving only  of runway plus the aircraft turnaround on the eastern end.

See also

 Transport in Honduras
 List of airports in Honduras

References

External links
 OpenStreetMap - Puerto Castillo
 

Defunct airports
Airports in Honduras
Colón Department (Honduras)